Joseph Gabriel Fernandez (16 September 1925 – 4 March 2023) was an Indian Roman Catholic prelate and the emeritus bishop of Quilon.

Fernandez died whilst undergoing treatment for pneumonia on 4 March 2023, at the age of 97.

References

External links
Joseph Gabriel Fernandez at Catholic Hierarchy

1925 births
2023 deaths
20th-century Roman Catholic bishops in India
21st-century Roman Catholic bishops in India
Bishops appointed by Pope Paul VI
People from Kollam district